These are the films shown at the 13th New York Underground Film Festival, held from March 8–14, 2006

See also
 New York Underground Film Festival site
 2006 Festival Archive

New York Underground Film Festival
New York Underground Film Festival, 2006
Underground Film Festival
New York Underground Film
2006 in American cinema